Euryuridae is a family of flat-backed millipedes in the order Polydesmida. There are at least 4 genera and about 14 described species in Euryuridae.

Genera
 Auturus Chamberlin, 1942
 Euryurus Koch, 1847
 Eutheatus
 Illiniurus Shear, 1968

References

Further reading

 
 
 
 

Polydesmida
Millipede families